Greemakolo is a village in Southwest Papua, Indonesia. The village is located in the southwestern-central part of the Bird's Head Peninsula, northeast of Teminabuan.
A dirt road connects it to Rawas in the northeast. The village is also close to a group of lakes called the Ayamaru Lakes.

References

Populated places in Southwest Papua